Life After 30 is a studio album by the American singer Freddie Jackson. It was released by Orpheus Music on September 14, 1999. Jackson's only album with the label, it peaked at number 81 on the US Top R&B/Hip-Hop Albums.

Track listing

Charts

References

1999 albums
Freddie Jackson albums